Georges Sarre (26 November 1935 – 31 January 2019) was a French politician and leader of the Citizen and Republican Movement.

Sarre was an early supporter of Jean-Pierre Chevènement and François Mitterrand within the new Socialist Party (PS), which he joined at the famous Epinay Congress in 1971. He was the Socialist top candidate in the 1977 Paris municipal election but lost the election by a handful of votes to Jacques Chirac.

He was elected MEP in the 1979 European elections and was elected to the French National Assembly for Paris in 1981. Between 1988 and 1993 he served as Secretary of State for Road and Fluvial Transportation in the governments led by Michel Rocard, Édith Cresson and Pierre Bérégovoy. He later served, between 1995 and 2008 as the Mayor of the 11th arrondissement of Paris.

In the left's 1993 debacle, he was re-elected in Paris' 6th constituency, the only constituency not won by the right in that election. That same year, disagreeing with the Socialist Party's neo-liberal derive, he joined Jean-Pierre Chevènement in creating the Citizens' Movement (MDC). The MDC became the Republican Pole in 2002 before adopting its current name, Citizen and Republican Movement (MRC). He supported Chevènement's candidacy in the 2002 presidential election and prepared a second Chevènement candidacy in the 2007 presidential election, but Chevènement did not run, instead supporting the Socialist candidate Ségolène Royal by the first round.

He was defeated in his constituency by the Socialist Danièle Hoffman-Rispal in the 2002 French legislative election. However, ahead of the 2007 presidential election and 2007 legislative election in which the MRC supported Royal's candidacy in return for the Socialist Party's endorsement of Sarre's candidacy in the Creuse's 2nd constituency in the June legislative election. Despite the lack of PS opposition, he lost the runoff to UMP incumbent Jean Auclair.

He was often considered the co-leader of the MRC along with Chevènement, although Chevènement is currently the MRC's President.

References

External links
George Sarre's blog
Biography on the website of the city of Paris

1935 births
2019 deaths
People from Creuse
Politicians from Nouvelle-Aquitaine
French Section of the Workers' International politicians
Socialist Party (France) politicians
Citizen and Republican Movement politicians
Deputies of the 7th National Assembly of the French Fifth Republic
Deputies of the 8th National Assembly of the French Fifth Republic
Deputies of the 9th National Assembly of the French Fifth Republic
Deputies of the 10th National Assembly of the French Fifth Republic
Deputies of the 11th National Assembly of the French Fifth Republic
French city councillors
Mayors of arrondissements of Paris